Nikolaj Steen Hansen (born 7 April 1987 in Copenhagen, Denmark) is a Danish footballer, who plays as a centre-back.

Career 
Before moving to Frem, Hansen had always played for FCK. His first team début came on 20 September 2006 in a cup match against Thisted FC. He replaced the injured Jacob Neestrup in the 61st minute in the match, which FCK won on penalties.

His league debut came on 22 October 2006, where he replaced Michael Gravgaard in the 61st minute of the 3–0 win against Viborg FF. He left F.C. Copenhagen at the end of 2008 and joined Frem on 2 February 2009.

Honours
Danish Superliga: 2006–07

References

External links
Danish national team profile

1987 births
Living people
Danish men's footballers
Denmark youth international footballers
Association football central defenders
F.C. Copenhagen players
Danish Superliga players
Danish 1st Division players
Boldklubben Frem players
Næstved Boldklub players
FC Helsingør players
Association football defenders
Footballers from Copenhagen